Panaspis maculicollis, also known as the speckle-lipped snake-eyed skink or spotted-neck snake-eyed skink, is a species of lidless skinks in the family Scincidae. The species is found in southern Africa.

Distribution
Panaspis maculicollis is found in northern South Africa, southern Mozambique, Zambia, Zimbabwe, northern Botswana, northeastern Namibia (Caprivi Strip), and southern Angola.

Description
Panaspis maculicollis is a small skink measuring on average  in snout–vent length.

Habitat
Panaspis maculicollis is a terrestrial skink that inhabits open or rocky savanna.

References

Panaspis
Skinks of Africa
Reptiles of Angola
Reptiles of Botswana
Reptiles of Mozambique
Reptiles of Namibia
Reptiles of South Africa
Reptiles of Zambia
Reptiles of Zimbabwe
Reptiles described in 2000
Taxa named by Donald George Broadley
Taxa named by Neils Henning Gunther Jacobsen